Salah Abdi Abdulle (born 17 September 1994), known professionally as Dree Low, is a former Swedish rapper and songwriter of Somali origin. He lives in Husby in western Stockholm. He broke through in 2019 with his albums No hasta mañana and Flawless. In September 2019, Flawless topped the Swedish Albums Chart and his single "Pippi" topped the Swedish Singles Chart. He has collaborated with a number of Swedish rappers; Adel, Пorsche, Stacks & Glocks 1.Cuz, Einár amongst many. He is childhood friends with footballer Robin Quaison.

On the 16th of January 2022, he informed that he will stop producing music and that his current music will be removed from YouTube, Spotify, Apple Music and similar services. It is believed that he found God during his most recent stay in prison, and that therefore, according to Islam, could not continue producing the music that he does as it is seemed violent, demeaning against women and often is on the topic of drugs.

Awards 
In 2020, Abdulle received two awards from public service broadcaster Sveriges Radio award ceremony .

Crime 
Abdulle has been convicted for driving without a license and for drug crime.

According to police, Abdulle has connections of the Husbys Hyenor  (English: hyenas of Husby) crime gang where it is said to be a driving force.

On September 22 2021, Abdulle was arrested at Stockholm Arlanda Airport, as a suspect in a case where three men robbed a convenience store. He was found guilty on November 1 2021 and sentenced to one year in prison. Two other men were also found guilty.

Discography

Studio albums

EPs

Singles

Featured singles

Other charting songs

Notes

References

Swedish rappers
1994 births
Living people
Swedish people of Somali descent
Swedish_criminals
21st-century criminals